Harry Emanuel Andersson (7 March 1913 – 6 June 1996) was a Swedish football striker.

He played for IK Sleipner and was the top scorer of the 1934–35 Allsvenskan. Andersson also played for the Sweden national football team, for whom he appeared in the 1938 FIFA World Cup in France, at which he scored three goals.

Career statistics

International 

 Scores and results list Sweden's goal tally first, score column indicates score after each Andersson goal.

Honours 
Individual

 Allsvenskan top scorer: 1934–35

References

External links 
 

1913 births
1996 deaths
Swedish footballers
Sweden international footballers
1938 FIFA World Cup players
Allsvenskan players
Association football forwards
IK Sleipner players
Sportspeople from Norrköping
Footballers from Östergötland County